The 2023 season is the 103rd season in the history of Perak and their 102nd season in the top flight. The club are participating in the Malaysia Super League, Malaysia FA Cup and Malaysia Cup.

Coaching staff

Head coach: Lim Teong Kim
Assistant head coach: Raja Azlan Shah
Assistant coach: Saravanan Vellu
Goalkeeper coach: Ng Wei Xian
Fitness coach: Sam Pakiaraj
Team doctor: Loong Cheng Wern, Ahmad Hazwan
Physiotherapist: Mohd Noradam, Rozairen Hairudin
Team admin: Zubir Shaharani
Masseur: Shaffiq Mokhtar
Kitman: Suhaimi Mohd Abidin

Players

First-team squad

Transfers

Players in

Players out

Pre-season and friendlies

Competitions

Malaysia Super League

Malaysia FA Cup

Statistics

Appearances and goals

|-
|colspan="14"|Players sold or loaned out after the start of the season:
|-

References

Perak